Xifias ("swordfish") was a Greek submarine (actually called a "submersible", καταδυόμενον, according to the then current French terminology) which served during  World War I. It was the third submarine to enter service in the Greek navy, and the second and last vessel of the Delfin class. It was taken over by the French in 1916, and decommissioned in 1920 without seeing action.

History
Along with its sister ship , the Xifias was ordered in 1910 from the Toulon shipyards in France. It was delivered to the Royal Hellenic Navy in March 1913, shortly after the end of the First Balkan War. It was thus unable to participate in any naval operations against the Ottoman fleet.

The French news-photograph concern Agènce Rol produced a series of photographs of Xifias undergoing diving and submerged torpedo-firing tests off Toulon in June 1913. Like its sister ship, Xifias was plagued by mechanical problems and had insufficient operational capabilities; as a consequence, its use was minimal in the years that followed. Xifias and the rest of the Greek fleet were confiscated by the French in October 1916, during the Greek National Schism. When the ships were returned in 1918, the two submarines were in a bad shape, and the following year, they were decommissioned.

Tradition
A second vessel of the Hellenic Navy has received the name Xifias: the British U-class submarine , which was leased to Greece in 1945–1952.

References

Greek Delfin-class submarines
Ships built in France
1913 ships
World War I submarines of Greece
World War I submarines of France